Oscar Orlando Burgos (born 18 January 1957 in Yoro) is a Honduran politician. He currently serves as deputy of the National Congress of Honduras representing the National Party of Honduras for Yoro.
primer alcalde reelecto en la ciudad de Yoro, Yoro (1998-2006)

References

1957 births
Living people
People from Tegucigalpa
Deputies of the National Congress of Honduras
National Party of Honduras politicians
People from Yoro Department